Deepak Mohanty   is an economist at India's central bank, the Reserve Bank of India (RBI). He holds the post of Executive Director at the head office of RBI in Mumbai. The areas supervised by him are monetary policy, economic research, and statistics. He has also worked in various positions in economic research and monetary policy departments of the RBI.

He served in the International Monetary Fund (IMF) as senior adviser.

He has graduated with a bachelor's degree in economics with honors from Ravenshaw College, Cuttack, in 1979, before going to Jawaharlal Nehru University for his master's degree. He also holds a master's degree in economics from Yale University. His current research interest includes monetary economics and international macroeconomics.

He has presided over a few committees in RBI for suggesting various policy changes by the central bank. In one such committee he suggested that only the repo rate should be the signalling rate and that the monetary system should almost always operate in a deficit. One other big suggestion he made is that the government's surplus cash deposited with the RBI should be auctioned so that there is no lead and lag in liquidity.

Mohanty has recently edited and contributed to a book of research papers titled Regional Economy of India: Growth and Finance.

He delivered the prestigious Prof. Baidyanath Misra Endowment Lecture of the Orissa Economics Association, in 2010.

References

Year of birth missing (living people)
Living people
20th-century Indian economists